Palierne equation connects the dynamic modulus of emulsions with the dynamic modulus of the two phases, size of the droplets and the interphase surface tension. The equation can also be used for suspensions of viscoelastic solid particles in viscoelastic fluids. The equation is named after French rheologist Jean-François Palierne, who proposed the equation in 1991.

For the dilute emulsions Palierne equation looks like:
 

The Palierne equation is usually extended for the finite volume concentrations of the  disperse phase  as:

References

Non-Newtonian fluids
Colloidal chemistry
Composite materials